Fort Mason is an unincorporated community in Lake County, Florida, United States.

Notable people
Nathan Philemon Bryan, U.S. Senator from Florida and United States circuit judge for the Fifth Circuit, was born near Fort Mason. He was the brother of William James Bryan.
William James Bryan, U.S. Senator from Florida, brother of Nathan Philemon Bryan.

Notes

Unincorporated communities in Lake County, Florida
Unincorporated communities in Florida